Grises de Humacao (lit. "Humacao Greys") is a basketball team based in Humacao, Puerto Rico, which competes in the Baloncesto Superior Nacional (BSN), the top professional league in Puerto Rico.

History
The team was originally created in 2005, when the Toritos de Cayey franchise was moved to Humacao. The Grises' homecourt is the Emilio Huyke coliseum.  In 2010 Antonio "Tonin" Casillas, the team's owner, decided to give the franchise a makeover and changed the name to Caciques de Humacao.  The main reason was to reflect a more positive image on a city which has always been known as the "gray" city.  The change also shifted the public opinion on to the Taino heritage of the city and honors the chieftain Jumakao, who fought a rebellion against the Spanish over 500 years ago.

Expansion franchise (2021–present)
Prior to the 2021 season, the league granted Florida-based businessman Ernesto Cambo a new franchise under the name of Grises de Humacao. The team replaced the Caciques, which were transferred to Guayama in 2019. Cambo named himself coach and brought in his son, Anthony, as an imported player.

Team

Current roster

References

BSN teams

it:Grises de Humacao